The West Wales lines are a group of railway lines from Swansea through Carmarthenshire to Pembrokeshire, West Wales. The main part runs from Swansea to Carmarthen and Whitland, where it becomes three branches to Fishguard, Milford Haven and Pembroke Dock.

Before the rail cuts of the 1960s, there were routes to Cardigan, Newcastle Emlyn, Llandysul, and via Lampeter, cross-country from Carmarthen to Aberystwyth.

History 

The railway to west Wales was first projected in 1844, and the proposal was for a line to run from the Great Western Railway near Gloucester to Fishguard, with a branch from Whitland to Pembroke.  The railway was called the South Wales Railway, and although it was in theory independent of the GWR, in practice it was very closely linked.  This was shown by the fact that Isambard Kingdom Brunel was the engineer, and the line was laid to the  broad gauge.

Construction began in 1847, but the company ran into financial difficulties. In addition, the Great Famine of Ireland reduced the prospective revenue from Anglo-Irish traffic.  As a result, instead of completing the line to the proposed port at Fishguard, the Haverfordwest branch was extended to Neyland where the harbour would cost less.

The line from Swansea opened as far as Carmarthen on 11 October 1852, Haverfordwest on 2 January 1854, and to its terminus at Neyland on 15 April 1856.  At first, the railway was leased to the GWR, but in 1863 the two companies were amalgamated.

The line opened from Tenby to Pembroke on 30 July 1863 and to Pembroke Dock on 8 August 1864. The extension from Tenby to the GWR line at Whitland opened on 4 September 1866. There were two adjoining stations at Whitland with no physical connection between the two lines because they operated on different gauges.

The line was engineered by Sir James Szlumper. It had its own police force until 1897, due to the high-security of the Naval Dockyard at Pembroke Dock, and the munitions transported.

The Pembroke & Tenby Company obtained powers in 1866 to extend their standard-gauge line from Whitland to Carmarthen. This would have enabled the Pembroke & Tenby to link up with the standard-gauge network through the Llanelly Railway, the Vale of Towy Railway and the Central Wales line. Through a series of inter-company working agreements, this would have had the effect of giving the London & North Western Railway unrestricted access to west Wales.  Within the Act for the extension to Carmarthen was a Schedule which allowed either party (the Pembroke & Tenby or the Great Western) to request the Great Western for running powers to the Pembroke company.  In doing this the cost of adding a rail to mix the gauge and installing the necessary junctions at Whitland and Carmarthen was £20,000 to be paid to the Great Western within 18 months of the request.  The request was made by the Pembroke company and consequently the Great Western converted the up line to standard gauge leaving the down line purely as broad.  This was not what the Pembroke company was wanting but had to live with it.  The Great Western maintained a crossing loop at St Clears for the broad gauge and this caused some hindrance to the Pembroke company.  The conversion is noted as the first pure broad to standard gauge for the Great Western.

The Pembroke & Tenby ran the first goods trains to Carmarthen on 1 June 1868, and passenger services in August 1869. The G.W.R began leasing the line on 1 July 1896 before finally amalgamated it a year later.

A Bill was approved by Parliament for the railway to extend eastwards to Carmarthen, although this was stopped when the line was bought out by the Great Western Railway in 1898.

The Rosebush line was closed during World War I because its rails were shipped to the Western Front in 1917 for use by the British Army.  In 1923 the line was relaid. However, passenger services ceased in 1937. The entire line was closed in 1949.

Passenger services stopped on the Whitland and Cardigan branch in 1962, followed by freight in 1963.  The line to  followed in 1964.  Pembrokeshire escaped lightly from the 1963 Beeching Report as none of the remaining three branches – to Fishguard, Milford Haven, and Pembroke Dock via Tenby – were proposed for closure. The Pembroke Dock branch survived a later closure proposal in the late 1960s.

The first freight line to the Oil Refineries was built in 1960 when Esso opened their first refinery in Milford Haven.

Current services

Until 2013, train services on the West Wales line were compromised, by the existence of a stretch of single track on the otherwise double-track main line. This  stretch of single track is between Cockett West Junction in the western suburbs of Swansea and Duffryn West Junction to the east of Llanelli. Within this section the River Loughor was crossed on a viaduct which required significant works to accommodate two tracks. Plans were advanced to replace the viaduct and restore double track, was completed in April 2013.

One intermediate station, Gowerton, also lies on this single-track stretch, with just the former Down (westbound) platform in use for trains in either direction. The disused former Up platform (without track) is still in existence. Less than half of all trains passing through Gowerton can be scheduled to make stops owing to pathing limitations.  Additionally, this tight pathing compromised route performance which can amplify delays and hence impact connections into and out of the long-distance Intercity services between Swansea, Cardiff and London. This is important since there are many interchange passengers from the Pembroke Dock line (which is mainly served by trains terminating at Swansea) for Cardiff and English destinations.

The double tracking work between Cockett and Dyffryn was completed by July 2013 with a revamped Gowerton railway station having the disused platform brought back into use.  This resulted in Gowerton railway station having an additional 95 trains stopping there every week. 
Additional problems are also found on the Single Lead Junction at Swansea Loop East junction (north of  station), which causes conflict between trains from west of Swansea and the eastbound mainline High Speed Train services. There are two passenger companies operating; Transport for Wales Rail and Great Western Railway.

Transport for Wales, Iarnród Éireann and Stena Line promotes SailRail using the Fishguard Harbour to Rosslare Europort service which links with the Iarnród Éireann trains to Dublin Connolly on the Dublin–Rosslare railway line.

Route 
The cities, towns and villages served by the route are listed below.  Towns in italics are served by InterCity express services.

Swansea to Whitland 
 Swansea
 connection with South Wales Main Line
 Gowerton
 Llanelli
 connection with Heart of Wales line and Swansea District line
 Pembrey and Burry Port
 Kidwelly (request stop)
 Ferryside (request stop)
 Carmarthen
 Whitland (junction for Pembroke Dock branch, served by Intercity services on Summer Saturdays)

Pembroke Dock branch 
All stations on this line are served by at least one of the two Intercity services that run down this line on Summer Saturdays.

 Narberth (request stop)
 Kilgetty (request stop)
 Saundersfoot (request stop)
 Tenby
 Penally (request stop)
 Manorbier
 Lamphey (request stop)
 Pembroke
 Pembroke Dock

Whitland to Clarbeston Road 
 Clunderwen (request stop). Former junction for the North Pembrokeshire and Fishguard Railway.
 Clarbeston Road (request stop, junction for Milford Haven and Fishguard branches)

Milford Haven branch 
 Haverfordwest
 Johnston (request stop)
 Milford Haven

Fishguard branch 
 former connection with the North Pembrokeshire and Fishguard Railway. It closed in May 1949.
 Fishguard and Goodwick
 Fishguard Harbour

Services

Great Western Railway 
Regular services 

Great Western Railway operate the following services:

Summer period

Cancelled services
The following services previously operated by Great Western Railway (and/or one or both of its predecessors First Great Western, Great Western Trains, British Rail and Great Western Railway) no longer operate:
This train was noted for its non-stop through-service to principal stations like ,  and 

Transport for Wales 
Due to the Single Lead Junction at Swansea and the single track between Cockett and Dyfryn, a standard repeating departure time service is not possible, therefore a non-standard departure time service is operated on these main routes:
  to  via  – every two hours
  to  – every two hours
  to  via  – every two hours
 Together with the Milford Haven–Manchester service this makes Carmarthen to Manchester hourly

Other services 
  to  – one train per night, connecting with the night ferry to Rosslare Europort, Ireland
  to  avoiding  – one train per day (normally via the Swansea District Line), connecting with daytime conventional ferry to Rosslare Europort, Ireland
Funding will be provided by the Welsh Assembly Government at the cost of £1.4m per annum. One of these extra trains in each direction was expected to connect with the summer-only Stena Lynx fast ferry to Rosslare Europort, Ireland in summer 2012, however Stena line then sold the Lynx fastcraft which means the summer 2012 Lynx service will no longer operate.

Freight 
The junction on the Fishguard branch to the former North Pembrokeshire and Fishguard Railway, which now leads to the former RNAD Trecwn site, has been refurbished. 
 One of the oil refineries near Milford Haven generates daily long-distance freight trains.
 The Tata Trostre tinplate works generates some freight traffic

Developments & upgrades 

In August 2006, SWWITCH performed a case review of the Fishguard branch to decide whether it was economically viable to continue to operate a passenger service to the harbour given the very scant (boat-trains only) service. In 2011, a local campaign resulted in extra service being launched. A year later it was announced that the closed Fishguard and Goodwick railway station would reopen.

In December 2008 the Welsh Assembly announced it had secured funding from the European Fund for Strategic Investments to upgrade sections of the line between Gowerton and Loughor. The improvement work has allowed more trains to stop at Gowerton while decreasing overall travel times, and an increase in the frequency of services between Swansea and Llanelli. In 2015, Network Rail made the proposal to reopen  in its annual Strategic Business Plan.

See also
 Traws Link Cymru

References

Further reading

Railway lines in Wales
Rail transport in Swansea
Rail transport in Carmarthenshire
Rail transport in Pembrokeshire
Railway lines opened in 1868
Railway companies disestablished in 1897
Standard gauge railways in Wales
1868 establishments in Wales